Pekonen is the surname of the following people
Aino-Kaisa Pekonen (born 1979), Finnish politician
Esa Pekonen (born 1979), Finnish footballer and manager
Meeri Pekonen (born 1937), Finnish long track speed skater
Osmo Pekonen (1960–2022), Finnish mathematician and author

Finnish-language surnames